The women's artistic gymnastics floor exercise final at the 2018 Summer Youth Olympics was held at the America Pavilion on 15 October.

Qualification 

Qualification took place on 7 October. Anastasiia Bachynska from Ukraine qualified in first, followed by Italy's Giorgia Villa and Ksenia Klimenko of Russia.

The reserves were:

Medalists

Results 
Oldest and youngest competitors

References 

Girls' floor exercise